George Shipley may refer to:
George Shipley (footballer) (born 1959), English footballer
George E. Shipley (1927–2003), U.S. Representative from Illinois